Joshua Verin (c. 1611 – 1695) was a founding settler of Providence in what would become the Colony of Rhode Island and Providence Plantations. He is best known for being disfranchised for violating his wife's freedom of conscience by severely beating her when she refused to stop attending prayer meetings held by Roger Williams.

Life 

Joshua Verin and his wife, Jane Verin (née Reeves), resided in New Sarum, Wiltshire, England, where he was a rope maker by trade. The Verins—including Joshua's mother-in-law, parents, and siblings—immigrated to New England aboard the James. They arrived in Boston in 1635 and settled in Salem where they became members of the First Church of Salem. 

Jane and Joshua disagreed about religion: Joshua was a non-separating Puritan while Jane and her mother, Margery Reeves, were separatists. Both women risked excommunication and corporal punishment for their beliefs and their refusal to attend the Salem church. The three soon moved to Providence, which was established by Roger Williams as a refuge for fellow separatists and other persecuted groups.

Joshua Verin, according to his own account, was one of the six people present at Providence's first settlement in 1636. Joshua was granted a Providence home lot adjacent to Williams's lot. In 1638, Jane's mother, Margery Reeves, also received a home lot.  

Against Joshua's wishes, Jane attended prayer meetings held by Roger Williams. As a result, Joshua severely beat Jane for her disobedience. In 1638, Joshua was tried, convicted, and disfranchised for "restraining her liberty of conscience."  Joshua returned to Salem with his wife whom he reportedly took against her will. 

In Salem, Joshua received 100 acres in 1638 and another 40 acres in 1640.  Jane was expelled from the Salem church in 1640 after which she does not appear in town records. Joshua moved to Barbados by 1663 where he acquired land and eleven slaves. He married Agnes Simpson in 1694 and died in Barbados in 1695.

Providence v Joshua Verin

The trial 
Sometime before May 21, 1638, Joshua Verin allegedly attacked his wife, Jane Verin, for attending prayer sessions led by Roger Williams. Joshua Verin was tried at a town meeting and convicted not for assault, but for interfering with his wife's liberty of conscience. Roger Williams wrote a letter to John Winthrop, the governor of Massachusetts Bay, on May 22, 1638—the day after the trial—in which he described the severity of the beating and the verdict:...he hath trodden her under foot tyrannically & brutishly; which she and we long bearing, though with his furious blows she went in danger of life, at the last the major vote of us discard him from our civil freedom, or disfranchise, &c....

The previous year the town had created the 1637 Providence Agreement, which was legally binding on each voting head of household, including Joshua Verin. We whose names are hereunder, desirous to inhabit in the town of Providence, do promise to subject ourselves in active and passive obedience to all such orders or agreements as shall be made for the public good of the body in an orderly way, by the major consent of present inhabitants, masters of families, incorporated together in a Towne fellowship, and others whom they shall admit unto them only in civil things.

The 1637 Agreement did not explicitly grant a right to liberty of conscience, but it prohibited the town from requiring obedience outside of civil matters, thus presuming and indirectly establishing religious freedom. The Verin verdict established the precedent for future cases and prompted the inclusion of the requirement "to hold forth the Liberty of Conscience" in the 1640 Providence Agreement.

Governor Winthrop made an entry in his journal about the trial.  According to Winthrop, a Providence townsman named William Arnold argued that Joshua Verin had a Biblical right to discipline his wife and so was also exercising his liberty of conscience. Surgeon John Greene argued to the contrary, that allowing spousal abuse in the name of liberty would create a backlash from all women.

According to town meeting records, on May 21, 1638, Joshua Verin was found guilty of violating his wife's liberty of conscience and he was disfranchised:The 21 die of ye 3 month / It was agreed that Joshua Verin upon ye breach of a covenant for restraining of ye liberty of conscience shall be withheld from the liberty of voting till he shall declare ye contrary.

Significance 
According to historian Margaret Manchester, "This incident appears to be the first time that a wife’s liberty of conscience, independent of her husband’s, was upheld in the English colonies."  According to legal scholar Edward Eberle, "This was quite a feat, as women of the Puritan time were thought of as servants of their husbands. Viewed against this backdrop, recognizing a woman's independence was an unprecedented act for the time, and a forward-looking vision of things to come."

Notes

References

External links
 Roger Williams: The Verin Case (nps.gov)
 

Kingdom of England emigrants to Massachusetts Bay Colony
People of colonial Rhode Island
People of colonial Massachusetts
1695 deaths
American city founders
History of Providence, Rhode Island
Pre-statehood history of Rhode Island
History of Salem, Massachusetts